Stellan Bengtsson (born 26 July 1952) is a Swedish former table tennis player. He became the first Swede to win the men's singles at the World Table Tennis Championships in 1971. He has won three World championships, seven European championships and 65 International championships.

He also won seven English Open titles.

Notable events
First Swede to win World Championships

Bengtsson was born in Falkenberg, on the West coast of Sweden in 1952 and began to play table tennis at the age of eight. His small stature (167 cm tall, weighing 60 kg) helped him match the Chinese and he became the first Swede to win the individual World Championships in 1971. In total, Bengtsson has no less than 10 World Championship - and 13 European Championship medals to his credit. Because of his world championship, Bengtsson earned the Svenska Dagbladet Gold Medal.

Statue Raised in Bengtsson's Honor

It was three Rotary clubs, Falkenbergs Rotaryclub, Falkenberg-Herting Rotaryclub and Falkenberg-Kattegatt Rotaryclub, who originally launched the proposal in autumn 2003 and Bengtsson naturally gladly accepted. Stellan Bengtsson's contribution to the world of table tennis was immortalized when a bronze statue of the legendary Swede was raised in his hometown, Falkenberg, in 2006. Half a million Swedish kronor was raised from various sponsors and a local artist, Martina Falkehag Finn, was chosen amongst a number of qualified candidates to complete the project. The statue is located in the Falkenberg city hall and will be moved to Falkenberg's new athletic arena when the new indoor stadium is completed in a couple of years. Stellan Bengtsson currently teaches in After School Learning Tree in San Diego, California. He coaches kids and others to play.

References

MARSHALL, Ian. Patience . ITTF. January 24, 2006
FRANDSEN, Svend. Statue raised in Bengtsson's honour. ITTF. March 23, 2006
The Fastest Wrists in the East. Time magazine. April 19, 1971

External links
Stellan's Official Coaching Website
Stellan's Championship News in Old Persian Magazine "Keyhan Varzeshi" DD Saturday 1 February 1975

Living people
1952 births
Swedish male table tennis players
People from Falkenberg
Sportspeople from Halland County